The Frontwalker Ladies Open was a women's professional golf tournament on the Swedish Golf Tour, played between 2005 and 2014. It was always held in Botkyrka near Stockholm, Sweden.

Winners

References

Swedish Golf Tour (women) events